João Pedro Ferreira Vilela (born 9 September 1985) is a Portuguese former professional footballer who played as an attacking midfielder.

Club career
A youth product of hometown's S.L. Benfica, joining at the age of nine, Lisbon-born Vilela was promoted to the main squad for the 2004–05 season, but only appeared in preseason for the club, joining Gil Vicente F.C. on loan in January 2006. On 26 March, he scored in a 1–1 home draw against Vitória S.C. in his fifth Primeira Liga game.

With the Barcelos side now in the second division, the move was made permanent in the summer, and Vilela totalled 81 official appearances in three years, netting 12 times. In 2009 he signed with another team in that level, C.D. Fátima, returning to Gil Vicente the following year and contributing three goals in 25 matches (15 starts) in his second season for a return to the top flight after five years.

On 25 June 2012, Vilela joined Iran Pro League side Tractor Sazi F.C. on a two-year contract, along with compatriot Anselmo Cardoso. In the next transfer window, however, he returned to his previous club due to unpaid wages.

In early July 2015, after suffering relegation to division two, Vilela left Gil and signed for C.F. Os Belenenses. Just six months later, he dropped down to the third tier and joined U.D. Leiria.

On 19 July 2016, the 30-year-old Vilela moved abroad again as he agreed to a two-year deal with FC Schaffhausen. He scored on his debut five days later, helping to a 1–0 win over FC Wil for the Swiss Challenge League; at his own request, he was released on 26 February 2017.

References

External links

1985 births
Living people
Footballers from Lisbon
Portuguese footballers
Association football midfielders
Primeira Liga players
Liga Portugal 2 players
Segunda Divisão players
S.L. Benfica B players
Gil Vicente F.C. players
C.D. Fátima players
C.F. Os Belenenses players
U.D. Leiria players
Persian Gulf Pro League players
Tractor S.C. players
Swiss Challenge League players
FC Schaffhausen players
Portugal youth international footballers
Portuguese expatriate footballers
Expatriate footballers in Iran
Expatriate footballers in Switzerland
Portuguese expatriate sportspeople in Iran
Portuguese expatriate sportspeople in Switzerland